Large-cell acanthomas are a cutaneous condition characterized by small, skin-colored, hyper- or hypopigmented papules or plaques.

See also 
 Clear cell acanthoma
 List of cutaneous conditions

References 

Epidermal nevi, neoplasms, and cysts